Portulacineae is a suborder of flowering plants in the order Caryophyllales comprising the families Anacampserotaceae, Basellaceae, Cactaceae (cacti), Didiereaceae, Halophytaceae, Montiaceae, Portulacaceae, and Talinaceae.  All three major kinds of succulent plant — stem succulents, leaf succulents, and caudiciform plants — are represented within this suborder.

References
 
 

Caryophyllales